Daniel 'Dani' Vega Cintas (born 11 January 1997) is a Spanish footballer who plays for Real Murcia CF, mainly as a winger.

Club career
Vega was born in Mérida, Badajoz, Extremadura. He made his senior debuts with Real Valladolid's reserve team in the 2014–15 campaign, in Segunda División B, aged only 17.

On 15 October 2014 Vega played his first match as a professional, starting in a 2–0 home win over Girona FC for the season's Copa del Rey. The remainder of his spell at the club was limited to the B-team, however.

On 2 July 2018, Vega moved to another reserve team, Celta de Vigo B also in the third division. He continued to appear in that category in the following years, representing UD Melilla and Extremadura UD.

References

External links

1997 births
Living people
People from Mérida, Spain
Sportspeople from the Province of Badajoz
Spanish footballers
Footballers from Extremadura
Association football forwards
Segunda División B players
Real Valladolid Promesas players
Real Valladolid players
Celta de Vigo B players
UD Melilla footballers
Extremadura UD footballers
CF Lorca Deportiva players